All the Time is the third studio album by Canadian musician Jessy Lanza. It was released through Hyperdub on July 24, 2020.

Release
The album's first single "Lick in Heaven" was released on February 20, 2020. The second single "Face" was released on April 27, 2020. The third single "Anyone Around" was released on July 9, 2020.

Critical reception

All the Time has a score of 82 out of 100 on Metacritic, indicating "universal acclaim", based on 13 reviews. Jay Singh of The Line of Best Fit reviewd "All The Time is a full embrace of the 'outsider popstar' she was once labelled as." Anna Gaca of Pitchfork said "All the Time is sincere so it doesn’t have to be deep—merely an invitation to look beneath the surface."

Track listing
Credits are adapted from Apple Music.

References

2020 albums
Jessy Lanza albums
Hyperdub albums